Sri Lanka, officially the Democratic Socialist Republic of Sri Lanka, is an island country in the northern Indian Ocean which has been known under various names over time.

Lanka 
Lak-vaesiyaa in Sinhala means an inhabitant of the island of Lanka. Lak-diva in E'lu (old Sinhala) means the island of Lanka. Another traditional Sinhala name for Sri Lanka was Lakdiva, with diva also meaning "island". A further traditional name is Lakbima. Lak in both cases is derived again from Lanka. The same name could have been adopted in Tamil as Ilankai; the Tamil language commonly adds "i" before initial "l". The Sanskrit epic Ramayana  mentioned it Lanka and the abode of King Ravan.

The name of Sri Lanka was introduced in the context of the Sri Lankan independence movement, pushing for the independence of British Ceylon during the first half of the 20th century. The name was used by the Marxist Lanka Sama Samaja Party, which was founded in 1935. The Sanskrit honorific Sri was introduced in the name of the Sri Lanka Freedom Party, founded in 1952. The Republic of Sri Lanka was officially adopted as the country's name with the new constitution of 1972, and changed to "Democratic Socialist Republic of Sri Lanka" in the constitution of 1978!

Ceylon 
Under British rule, the island was known as Ceylon from 1815 to 1972.

Serendip 
The name "Serendip"  given by Arabs due to Lankan Rubi and pearl.  The name Ceylon too originated from an Arabic name "Saheelan" since they had long trading history with Lanka. Then Romans called it "Sielen" 
The name Ceylon has a complicated history going back to antiquity. Theory states that the name comes from Sielen as the island was known by the Romans as Serendivis and by Arabs as Serandib and the Persians as Serendip (the root from which serendipity is derived) while Greeks called the island Sielen Diva or Sieldiba. The name is said to be based on the word Sinhaladvipa which is also used in the Culavamsa as a name for the Island. From the word Sielen, many European forms were derived: Latin Seelan, Portuguese Ceilão, Spanish Ceilán, French Seilan, Ceylan, Dutch Zeilan, Ceilan and Seylon, and of course the English Ceylon. Ptolemy called the Island Salike, and the inhabitants Salai. Another theory is that the name derives from the Tamil words cheran for the Tamil dynasty of the Chera and the words theevu which means "island" in Tamil.

Taprobana, Tamraparni 

Tamraparni is according to some legends the name given by Prince Vijaya when he arrived on the island. The word can be translated as "copper-coloured leaf", from the words Thamiram (copper in Sanskrit) and Varni (colour). Another scholar states that Tamara means red and parani means tree, therefore it could mean "tree with red leaves". Tamraparni is also a name of Tirunelveli, the capital of the Pandyan kingdom in Tamil Nadu. The name was adopted in Pali as Tambaparni.

The name was adopted into Greek as Taprobana, used by Megasthenes in the 4th century BC. The Greek name was adopted in medieval Irish (Lebor Gabala Erenn) as Deprofane (Recension 2) and Tibra Faine (Recension 3), off the coast of India, supposedly one of the countries where the Milesians / Gaedel, ancestors of today's Irish, had sojourned in their previous migrations.

The name remained in use in early modern Europe, alongside the Persianate Serendip,
with Traprobana mentioned in the first strophe of the Portuguese national epic poem Os Lusíadas by Luís de Camões.

John Milton borrowed this for his epic poem Paradise Lost and Miguel de Cervantes mentions a fantastic Trapobana in Don Quixote.

Helabima 
Sri Lanka has also been known as Helabima, meaning "Land of Helas", which is a name that Sinhalese were called. Siṃhala is attested as a Sanskrit name of the island of Ceylon (Sri Lanka) in the Bhagavata Purana and Rajatarangini. T

Eelam 

The earliest use of the word is found in a Tamil-Brahmi inscription as well as in the Sangam literature. The Tirupparankunram inscription found near Madurai in Tamil Nadu and dated on palaeographical grounds to the 1st century BCE, refers to a person as a householder from Eelam (Eela-kudumpikan).

The most favoured explanation derives it from a word for the spurge (palm tree), via the application to a caste of toddy-drawers, i.e. workers drawing the sap from palm trees for the production of palm wine.
The name of the palm tree may conversely be derived from the name of the caste of toddy drawers, known as Eelavar, cognate with the name of Kerala, from the name of the Chera dynasty, via Cheralam, Chera, Sera and Kera.

The stem Eela is found in Prakrit inscriptions dated to 2nd century BC in Sri Lanka in personal names such as Eela-Barata and Eela-Naga. The meaning of Eela in these inscriptions is unknown although one could deduce that they are either from Eela a geographic location or were an ethnic group known as Eela. From the 19th century onwards, sources appeared in South India regarding a legendary origin for caste of toddy drawers known as Eelavar in the state of Kerala. These legends stated that Eelavar were originally from Eelam.

There have also been proposals of deriving Eelam from Simhala (comes from Elam, Ilam, Tamil, Helmand River, Himalayas). Robert Caldwell (1875), following Hermann Gundert, cited the word as an example of the omission of initial sibilants in the adoption of Indo-Aryan words into Dravidian languages. The University of Madras Tamil Lexicon, compiled between 1924 and 1936, follows this view. Peter Schalk (2004) has argued against this, showing that the application of Eelam in an ethnic sense arises only in the early modern period, and was limited to the caste of "toddy drawers" until the medieval period.

Suggested Biblical names
Tarshish. According to James Emerson Tennent, Galle was said to be the ancient city of Tarshish where King Solomon drew ivory, peacocks and others. Cinnamon was exported from Sri Lanka as early as 1400 BC and as the root of the word itself is Hebrew, Galle may have been the entrepôt for the spice.

Dambadiva, Jambudvipa 
Although now referring to India, The name had also, earlier been used to name Sri Lanka. As several ancient and pre-colonial sources like an 19th century English book titled Ceylon and the Cinghalese (written by Sir, Henry Charles) first published in 1850. On page 203, it says that a conference in Dambadiva (57 miles from Colombo) had been requested.

Nickname/Special names
 Pearl of the Indian ocean
 Teardrop in the Indian ocean

See also 
 Sri Lankan place name etymology

References

External links 

 Ancient Names of Sri Lanka

 
Sri Lanka
Sri Lanka